Emmanuel Legace (born February 4, 1973) is a Canadian former professional ice hockey goaltender, who played most notably in the National Hockey League for the Detroit Red Wings, and later the St. Louis Blues. Legace also enjoyed spells with the Los Angeles Kings, Carolina Hurricanes, and Iserlohn Roosters of the DEL. He finished his playing career for the Springfield Falcons of the American Hockey League, for whom he is the career leader in goaltending wins. Legace currently serves as the goaltending coach for the NHL's Columbus Blue Jackets.

Legace was born in Toronto, Ontario, but grew up in Alliston, Ontario.

Playing career
As a youth, Legace played in the 1987 Quebec International Pee-Wee Hockey Tournament with a minor ice hockey team from Don Mills.

Prior to being selected by the Whalers, Legace played in the Ontario Hockey League with the Niagara Falls Thunder and in Roller Hockey International for the Toronto Planets. Legace spent the 1993–1994 season as a member of the Canadian National Team and played in sixteen games.

From there, Legace spent a lengthy apprenticeship in the minor leagues, largely for the Springfield Falcons, between 1994–98. He was a star with Springfield, garnering First Team All-Star honors and the AHL's leading goaltender award in 1996.

He also played a brief stint for the ECHL's Richmond Renegades in 1996–97 and for the IHL's Las Vegas Thunder in 1997–98. On July 31, 1998, the Carolina Hurricanes traded Legace to the Los Angeles Kings for a conditional draft pick in the 1999 NHL Entry Draft.

Although he spent most of the 1999 season with the IHL Long Beach Ice Dogs, Legace got his first NHL start with the Kings. While he played well in limited action for Los Angeles, he signed with Detroit on July 15, 1999. However, since the Red Wings had both Chris Osgood and Ken Wregget as veteran goaltenders, Legace was left unprotected on waivers. He was then claimed by the Vancouver Canucks on September 29, 1999. Yet almost two weeks later, on October 13, 1999, Legace was reacquired by the Red Wings from the waiver wire when the Canucks in turn left him unprotected. While Legace spent most of his time playing for the IHL's Manitoba Moose, he did get some action while playing for the Red Wings, posting a perfect 4–0–0 record.

Detroit Red Wings
In training camp the next season, Legace beat out Wregget to establish himself as the backup goaltender to Chris Osgood. Osgood had a very slow start, and Legace subsequently saw much action. Posting a 24–5–5 record in 39 games, Legace looked to have assumed the starting role for the team. However, Osgood regained his stride and resumed starting duties in the playoffs.

With the 2001–02 season, Legace became backup to Dominik Hašek when Osgood was waived and claimed by the New York Islanders. Legace played in 20 games and only saw playoff action to relieve Hašek during a loss to the St. Louis Blues; the Red Wings won the Stanley Cup that season.

The next season, with the retirement of Hašek and the signing of star goaltender Curtis Joseph, Legace saw his workload increase from 20 games to 25 games in the 2002–03 season, yet remained the team's backup.

At the start of the 2003–04 season, Hašek made the startling decision to come out of retirement and return to the Red Wings. Curtis Joseph was still being paid $8 million a year and, due to his hefty contract, was not likely to be traded or picked up by a team. While Legace was initially going to be the 3rd goalie behind two elite goaltenders, the Red Wings opted to send Joseph to the minors while Legace served as Hašek's backup. Hašek, however, was not properly conditioned for a return to the NHL. Minor injuries and inconsistent play from Hašek thrust Legace into the starting role. Injuries to both Hašek and Legace opened the door for the Red Wings to call up Joseph from the minors, along with Joey MacDonald to serve as his backup. When Legace returned from injury, MacDonald was sent back to the minors while Legace and Joseph ended up serving as Detroit's goaltending tandem for the remainder of the season, as Hašek opted not to return to the team from injury. An injury to Joseph late in the season found Legace temporarily working with minor-league goaltender Marc Lamothe, but Lamothe was returned to the AHL's Grand Rapids Griffins when Joseph returned to the roster.

Due to Legace's strong play during the regular season, he was announced as Detroit's starting goaltender for the start of the 2004 Stanley Cup Playoffs. The Red Wings faced the Nashville Predators in the opening round of the 2004 playoffs. While Legace won the first two games, he did not perform up to team expectations and was pulled in the middle of the fourth game in favor of Joseph, who ended up backstopping for the remainder of the series. The Red Wings won the series but lost the next series against the Calgary Flames.

Legace briefly played in Russia during the 2004–05 NHL lockout, but eventually sat the rest of the season out, preferring to be close to his family in the States. Legace was the NHLPA Representative for the Detroit Red Wings until 2005, when the role was assumed by Nicklas Lidström. Legace has since become a vocal critic of both the league and the players' union, especially in regard to how both sides handled the 2004–05 NHL lockout.

For the 2005–06 season, Chris Osgood was re-signed by the Red Wings to compete with Legace for the starting job. However, due to Osgood's injuries and general lack of conditioning, Legace was awarded the starting goaltender role for the Detroit Red Wings. By October 2005 with the Red Wings defeating the Chicago Blackhawks 5–2, Legace set the record for the most wins by a goaltender in the month of October (10–1).

He would finish the regular season with a record of 37–8–3, helping lead the Red Wings to the Presidents' Trophy as the NHL's best regular season team by far.

St. Louis Blues
Prior to Detroit's elimination from the 2006 playoffs, Legace indicated to the media that if Detroit failed to win the opening round of the playoffs, he would not be returning to the team. The Red Wings fell to the Edmonton Oilers in six games. On June 10, 2006, Red Wings general manager Ken Holland announced that Legace would not be offered a contract, thus making him a free agent. Legace signed a one-year contract with Wings' division-rivals, the St. Louis Blues on August 8, 2006. In his first season with the Blues Legace played in 45 games, posting a 23–15–5 record. His season was cut short due to a mid-season concussion and season-ending knee surgery, but his play was solid enough to earn him a two-year contract extension with the Blues on February 24, 2007.

Legace enjoyed success with St. Louis in the 2007–08 season, and was named to the 2008 NHL All-Star Game. Despite Legace's numbers, the Blues failed to qualify for the playoffs for the third consecutive season. In the 2008–09 season, Legace shared starting duties with Chris Mason to begin the season. After failing to repeat his previous season efforts the Blues placed Legace on waivers on February 6, 2009. Legace was then demoted to the team's AHL affiliate Peoria Rivermen for the remainder of the season and helped the Rivermen reach the playoffs. Manny admitted later that there was animosity between him and the Blues management.

Carolina Hurricanes 
On November 9, 2009, Legace signed a one-year contract with the Carolina Hurricanes. The two-way deal  paid Legace $500,000 to play in the NHL level and $105,000 to play at the AHL level. His first game with the Carolina Hurricanes was on November 11, 2009, against the Los Angeles Kings, where they fell 5–2 in Raleigh at the RBC Center.

Later years 
On September 26, 2010 the New York Islanders announced they signed Legace to a PTO. he was released a few weeks later. For the remainder of the 2010–11 season, Legace played in the Deutsche Eishockey Liga (DEL) in Germany for the Iserlohn Roosters, with whom he had a one-year contract.

During the 2011 pre-season, Legace made two exhibition appearances for the Vancouver Canucks on a Professional Tryout basis before being released by the team on September 23rd. A week later, on September 30, 2011, Legace signed a Professional Tryout contract (PTO) with the San Antonio Rampage of the AHL, the minor league affiliate of the Florida Panthers of the National Hockey League. Legace started for the Rampage for the first game of the season vs. the Chicago Wolves, but after approximately 10 minutes he was plowed into by Chicago forward Mike Duco, resulting in an undisclosed leg injury. He would not return to the ice for San Antonio again. On October 20, 2011, he signed a Professional Tryout contract (PTO) with the Springfield Falcons, the minor league affiliate of the Columbus Blue Jackets and the team he played for in the mid-1990s.  Legace finished his career as the backup goaltender in Springfield, after which he briefly served as an intern in the Columbus front office.

Retirement

Broadcasting 
On October 25, 2013, it was announced that Legace had also joined Fox Sports Detroit as a college hockey analyst.

Goaltending coaching 
On November 14, 2012, Legace accepted the position of goaltender coach for the Muskegon Lumberjacks of the United States Hockey League. After two seasons he joined the Springfield Falcons coaching staff on a full-time basis, serving originally as a goaltending coach before moving into a team consultancy role.

In 2018, Legace became goaltending coach for the Columbus Blue Jackets, a promotion from the same role held with the Blue Jackets' minor league affiliates, the Cleveland Monsters. Legace continues to serve as the head goalie coach for the Blue Jackets today.

Personal life
Legace resides in Novi, Michigan. He has one daughter, Sabrina, and a son, Manny.

On July 4, 2021, Columbus Blue Jackets goaltender Matiss Kivlenieks died from chest trauma caused by a mortar firework explosion at Legace’s home in Novi.

International play

Legace was the starting goaltender for Canada at the 1993 World Junior Ice Hockey Championships, where he won a gold medal and was named to the All-Star team.

Legace was named to Team Canada for the 1994 Winter Olympics, where he served as a backup goalie, and won a silver medal.

Awards
 Won a silver medal at the 1994 Winter Olympics
 Member of the 2002 Stanley Cup championship winning Detroit Red Wings
 2008 All-Star Game

Career statistics

Regular season and playoffs

International

References

External links

1973 births
Canadian expatriate ice hockey players in Russia
Canadian ice hockey coaches
Canadian ice hockey goaltenders
Carolina Hurricanes players
Columbus Blue Jackets coaches
Detroit Red Wings players
Franco-Ontarian people
Grand Rapids Griffins players
Hartford Whalers draft picks
HC Khimik Voskresensk players
Ice hockey people from Simcoe County
Ice hockey players at the 1994 Winter Olympics
Living people
Long Beach Ice Dogs (IHL) players
Los Angeles Kings players
Manitoba Moose (IHL) players
Medalists at the 1994 Winter Olympics
National Hockey League All-Stars
Niagara Falls Thunder players
Olympic ice hockey players of Canada
Olympic medalists in ice hockey
Olympic silver medalists for Canada
Peoria Rivermen (AHL) players
Richmond Renegades players
St. Louis Blues players
San Antonio Rampage players
Ice hockey people from Toronto
Springfield Falcons players
Stanley Cup champions
Toronto Planets players